Duncan's 151A is an Indian reserve of the Duncan's First Nation in Alberta, located within the Municipal District of Peace No. 135. It is 39 kilometers southwest of Peace River. In the 2016 Canadian Census, it recorded a population of 150 living in 52 of its 56 total private dwellings.

References

Municipal District of Peace No. 135

Indian reserves in Alberta
Peace River Country